Nataša Andonova (born 4 December 1993) is a Macedonian professional footballer who plays as a forward for Spanish Liga F club Levante UD and captains the North Macedonia women's national team. She is the younger sister of Sijce Andonova, who is also a Macedonian footballer. She is the top scorer in the history of the Macedonian national team.

Career
Andonova began her career at ZFK Tikvešanka in Macedonia. She first came to international attention in the 2010 Under-19 Euro, hosted by the Republic of Macedonia. Despite playing in the weakest team in the competition Andonova was named the tournament's best player. By then she had already represented the senior Macedonia national team.

In the summer of 2010 Andonova was transferred to ZFK Borec, playing the preliminary stage of the 2010–11 Champions League, and in the winter market she signed for Turbine Potsdam, the reigning European champions, along with her sister Sijce. She was promoted to the first team in February and played her first Bundesliga match that same month. She scored her first goal for Turbine in the semi-finals of the DFB-Pokal against Bayern Munich.

She was the second top scorer of the 2011 Bundesliga Cup with 7 goals.

In May 2015 Andonova left Turbine for Swedish Damallsvenskan champions FC Rosengård, who were in the market for a forward after the departure of Anja Mittag to Paris Saint-Germain.

On 31 January 2017, Paris Saint-Germain announced that an agreement with Andonova was reached for a permanent deal until the end of the season in June 2017. In PSG, Andonova wore the number 15.

The player did not renew her contract with PSG and joined Barcelona in June 2017. Andonova wore the number 21 with Barcelona.

International goals

References

External links

 Turbine Potsdam profile 
 
 
 Player domestic stats  at DFB
 Macedonian Football
 
 Article on Barca signing at l'Équipe 

1993 births
Living people
People from Negotino
1. FFC Turbine Potsdam players
Macedonian women's footballers
North Macedonia women's international footballers
Expatriate women's footballers in Germany
Macedonian expatriate sportspeople in Germany
FC Rosengård players
Damallsvenskan players
Expatriate women's footballers in Sweden
Macedonian expatriate sportspeople in Sweden
Expatriate women's footballers in France
Macedonian expatriate sportspeople in France
Division 1 Féminine players
Macedonian expatriate sportspeople in Spain
Expatriate footballers in Spain
Primera División (women) players
FC Barcelona Femení players
Women's association football forwards
Levante UD Femenino players